Paganicons is the debut EP of punk band Saccharine Trust, released on December 10, 1981 through SST.

Recording
Inspired by Minutemen, Saccharine Trust desired to make an album that experimented with different forms of rock. Guitarist Joe Baiza considered music "a conceptual art project".

Cover art
Joe Baiza initially submitted the art for New Alliance Records' compilation Cracks in the Sidewalk but it was rejected by Mike Watt so Baiza used it for Paganicons instead.

Release and reception 

In Journals, Kurt Cobain of Nirvana ranked Paganicons as his ninth favorite record. Allmusic critic John Dougan was less enthusiastic, criticising vocalist Jack Brewer's performance as "especially irritating and pretentious", though further writing that "there are indications that there's an interesting band here, especially in the abrasive guitar playing of Joe Baiza."

Track listing

Personnel 

Saccharine Trust
Joe Baiza – guitar
Jack Brewer – vocals
Rob Holzman – drums
Earl Liberty – bass guitar

Additional musicians and production
Jasper Jackson – photography
Raymond Pettibon – illustrations
Saccharine Trust – production
Spot – production, engineering
Mike Watt – production

References

External links 
 

1981 EPs
SST Records EPs
Saccharine Trust albums